Phyo Yong-myong (born November 26, 1989 in Pyongyang) is a North Korean figure skater who has competed internationally as both a singles skater, pairs skater and ice dancer. She currently is competing as an ice dancer alongside partner Choe Min. 

As a pair skater, she competed in the 2006 Winter Olympics with partner Jong Yong-hyok, with whom she teamed up in the fall of 2005. They withdrew after the short program at the Olympics. Jong had qualified a spot for the Olympics with his usual partner Sung Mi-hyang. However, Sung was not age-eligible for the Olympics, so he switched partners for the Olympics. Phyo and Jong ended their partnership following the Olympics.

As an ice dancer with partner Choe Min, they are three-time North Korean national champions in ice dance. The team placed sixth at the 2018 Asian Open.

As a single skater, she is a 2008 North Korean bronze medalist.

External links
 
 

Figure skaters at the 2006 Winter Olympics
Olympic figure skaters of North Korea
North Korean female single skaters
North Korean female pair skaters
North Korean female ice dancers
Sportspeople from Pyongyang
1989 births
Living people